The People's Movement for Progress (MPP) is a political party in Burkina Faso that was founded on 25 January 2014 by former Congress for Democracy and Progress member Roch Marc Christian Kaboré. Kaboré ran as the party's presidential candidate in the 2015 general election and was elected in the first round of voting; the MPP also won a plurality of seats in the National Assembly of Burkina Faso. It is a full member of the Progressive Alliance and Socialist International. On January 24, 2022, Kaboré was deposed as Burkina Faso President and arrested following a military coup.

Electoral history

Presidential elections

National Assembly elections

References

2014 establishments in Burkina Faso
Full member parties of the Socialist International
Political parties established in 2014
Political parties in Burkina Faso
Progressive parties
Social democratic parties in Burkina Faso